
Year 199 BC was a year of the pre-Julian Roman calendar. At the time it was known as the Year of the Consulship of Lentulus and Tappulus (or, less frequently, year 555 Ab urbe condita). The denomination 199 BC for this year has been used since the early medieval period, when the Anno Domini calendar era became the prevalent method in Europe for naming years.

Events 
 By place 
 Roman Republic 
 The Roman general Gnaeus Baebius Tamphilus attacks the Insubres in Gaul, but loses over 6,700 soldiers in the process.
 Scipio Africanus becomes censor and princeps Senatus (the titular head of the Roman Senate).
 The Roman law, Lex Porcia, is proposed by the tribune P. Porcius Laeca to give Roman citizens in Italy and provinces the right of appeal in capital cases.

Births

Deaths

References